The Transports en commun lyonnais ("Lyon public transport" in French; usually referred to as TCL) is the Lyon public transport agency.

TCL is managed by two companies: SYTRAL Mobilités sets policies and finances the infrastructure, while Keolis Lyon runs the network on a day-to-day basis.

Network

Lines 
TCL manages:
4 metro lines     

2 funiculars   

7 tramway lines         (The  Rhônexpress tram-train line is not run by TCL)

24 high-frequency bus lines, including electric trolleybuses
Over 100 other bus lines, including electric trolleybuses

Major stations 
The TCL network is built around several big stations connecting metro and tram lines:
Bellecour is set in the very centre of the city and has many connections with other stations.
Hôtel de Ville
Charpennes is the crossroad of several metro and tram lines to every direction (north, east, south, west).
Saxe–Gambetta
Part-Dieu is in La Part-Dieu business district and serves Part-Dieu railway station, the most important railway station in Lyon.
Perrache is a major TCL station served by metro, tramway and bus lines located inside Perrache Multimodal Hub (Centre d'échanges de Perrache), a large transport dedicated building that also houses Perrache coach station, served by regional, national and international coach services. By a short footbridge, pedestrians can directly walk from the multimodal hub to Perrache railway station, the second most important railway station in Lyon.
Vaulx-en-Velin–La Soie

Some other major stations are connecting suburban bus lines to metro or tram lines, and sometimes railway stations:
Gare de Vaise (Vaise railway station)
Gare de Vénissieux (Vénissieux railway station)
Gare d'Oullins (Oullins railway station)
Gorge de Loup (Gorge de Loup railway station)
Laurent Bonnevay

Night service 
Several bus lines run one bus per hour throughout the night, mostly to allow young people to get home. Since September 2021 there have been three such lines, labelled "Pleine Lune" ("full moon") (fr). A fourth line, Pleine Lune 4, was discontinued in March 2020.
 Pleine Lune 1 (PL1): Terreaux – La Feuillée → Cordeliers → Part-Dieu–Jules Favre → Charpennes–Charles Hernu → INSA – Einstein → Cité Internationale
 Pleine Lune 2 (PL2): Hôtel de Ville → Bellecour–Antonin Poncet → Saxe–Gambetta → Bachut–Mairie du 8ème → Grange Blanche
 Pleine Lune 3 (PL3): Hôtel de Ville → Saint-Irénée → Valmy → Écully Centre → Campus Lyon Ouest

Fares 

The TCL network has a fare system composed of paper tickets and a contactless smartcard named Técély.

Tickets or Técély card need to be validated at ticket barriers when entering a metro or funicular station, or at ticket validators located on board of trams, buses and trolleybuses. Validation of ticket or Técély card is mandatory at each connection, except for connections between metro or funicular lines.

Tickets 

There are multiple types of tickets, with different validity durations. There are also different tarifications regarding the age of the passenger.

The most basic ticket is the "1-hour ticket", it can be validated unlimitedly during 1 hour starting from the first validation. It costs €1.90, and it can also be purchased in booklets of 10 tickets at €18 (€1.80 each ticket). This ticket is red.

A "1-hour ticket" at a reduced price is available for people under 26 years old and students under 28 years old, it is sold only by booklets of 10 tickets at €15.40 (€1.54 each ticket). This ticket is yellow.

Another version of the "1-hour ticket" is sold by bus and trolleybus drivers, this one costs €2.20. It is more expensive than an usual ticket in order to encourage people to buy tickets at vending machines or other sales points. This ticket is grey.

There are also long duration tickets valid during 2, 24, 48 or 72 hours starting from the first validation. These tickets are green.

Técély card 

Introduced on 1 July 2002, the Técély card (Carte Técély) is the contactless smartcard of the TCL network. The card itself costs €5 and is usable during five years, it can be obtained in the five TCL agencies or by mail order.

To be valid, the Técély card needs to be recharged with a weekly, monthly or annual pass.

Booklets of 10 "1-hour tickets" can also be recharged on the Técély card, at normal or reduced price, depending on the age or status of the card holder. Up to 40 tickets can be contained at a time on a Técély card.

Tickets recharged on the card will be debited at validation only if no weekly, monthly or annual pass is recharged on the card. If there is a pass and tickets recharged at the same time on the card, no ticket will be debited at validation.

Sales points 

Buying tickets and recharging Técély cards is possible at different types of sales points:
5 TCL agencies (Agence TCL) are located at major stations (Bellecour, Grange Blanche, Gorge de Loup, Part-Dieu, La Soie). This is the only place to get a new Técély card.
Proposed services: Buy tickets, recharge the Técély card with "1-hour tickets", recharge the Técély card with a weekly/monthly/annual pass, recharge the Técély card with a monthly pass subscription, get a new Técély card.
477 ticket vending machines are available across all metro, funicular and tram stations, and at some stations of trolleybus lines C1, C2 and C3.
Proposed services: Buy tickets, recharge the Técély card with "1-hour tickets", recharge the Técély card with weekly/monthly/annual pass.
220 TCL service points (Point service TCL) are located in TCL's partners shops.
Proposed services: Buy tickets, recharge the Técély card with "1-hour tickets", recharge the Técély card with a monthly/annual pass.
More than 100 ATMs of CIC and Crédit Mutuel banks propose to recharge Técély cards, even with a payment card from another bank.
Proposed services: Recharge the Técély card with "1-hour tickets", recharge the Técély card with a monthly/annual pass.

See also 
Lyon Metro
Funiculars of Lyon
Lyon tramway
Rhônexpress
Buses in Lyon
Trolleybuses in Lyon
Réseau Express de l'Aire métropolitaine lyonnaise

References

External links
 Official website
 Picture library of transport in Lyon

Public transport operators in France
Transport in Auvergne-Rhône-Alpes
Transport in Lyon
Rapid transit in Lyon
Lyon
Lyon Metropolis